Andrija Vlahović (born 23 September 1991) is a Croatian water polo player. He is currently playing for VK Solaris. He is 6 ft 4 in (1.94 m) tall and weighs 216 lb (98 kg).

References

External links
 SOLARISOV TOPNIK Andrija Vlahović otkriva zašto je napustio Mladost i vratio se u stari klub u Crnici: U Zagrebu nisam bio sretan ni kao igrač ni kao čovjek

1991 births
Living people
Croatian male water polo players
Sportspeople from Šibenik